Kurixalus absconditus is a species of frog in the family Rhacophoridae. It is endemic to West Kalimantan, in the Indonesian part of Borneo, and is only known from its type locality near the village of Piasak; it is likely to occur more widely. The specific name absconditus is Latin for "disguised", "concealed", or "hidden", and refers to this species remaining "undetected" within the Kurixalus appendiculatus group.  Common name Piasak-frilled swamp treefrog, also spelled Piasak frilled swamp tree frog, has been coined for it.

Description
The head is longer than it is wide. The snout has pointed tip. The tympanum is distinct but small. The supratympanic fold is present. The limbs are slender. The finger and toe tips are expanded into round discs; those of fingers are larger than the toe ones. Finger webbing is poorly developed while toe webbing is moderately developed. The upper eyelids have a series of rounded small tubercles. The dorsum is brown with green speckles and a sparse and disjointed of dark brown saddle-shaped mark. The flanks are brown with few green speckles. The groin is whitish. The iris is bright gold and has distinct black reticulation and a black scleral ring.

Male advertisement call, females, and tadpoles of this species are not known.

Habitat and conservation
It shared this habitat with the frogs Amnirana nicobariensis, Chalcorana raniceps, Hylarana erythraea, Polypedates colletti, Pulchrana baramica, and Limnonectes paramacrodon.

This species is known from a small number of specimens from a single locality. As of late 2020, it had not yet been assessed for the IUCN Red List of Threatened Species.

References

bisacculus
Frogs of Asia
Amphibians of Indonesia
Endemic fauna of Indonesia
Endemic fauna of Borneo
Amphibians described in 2019
Amphibians of Borneo